The 1997 IGA Tennis Classic was a women's tennis tournament played on indoor hard courts at The Greens Country Club in Oklahoma City, Oklahoma in the United States that was part of Tier III of the 1997 WTA Tour. It was the twelfth edition of the tournament and was held from February 17 through February 23, 1997. First-seeded Lindsay Davenport won the singles title.

Finals

Singles

 Lindsay Davenport defeated  Lisa Raymond 6–4, 6–2
 It was Davenport's 2nd title of the year and the 20th of her career.

Doubles

 Rika Hiraki /  Nana Miyagi defeated  Marianne Werdel-Witmeyer /  Tami Whitlinger-Jones 6–4, 6–1
 It was Hiraki's 1st title of the year and the 4th of her career. It was Miyagi's 3rd title of the year and the 7th of her career.

Prize money

References

External links
 ITF tournament edition details
 Tournament draws

IGA Classic
U.S. National Indoor Championships
IGA Tennis Classic
IGA Tennis Classic
IGA Tennis Classic